Beach Park may refer to:
 Beach Park, Illinois, a village in Illinois
 Beach Park (Tampa), a neighborhood in the City of Tampa, Florida
 Beach Park Isles, a neighborhood in the City of Tampa, Florida
 Beach Park (water park), a waterpark in Fortaleza, Brazil
 Beach View Park, a beach view park in Karachi, Pakistan
 Beach Park (Bakersfield), a public park adjacent to the Kern River in Bakersfield, California
 Beach Park (Galveston)
 Beach Park (Pärnu), park in Pärnu, Estonia